Lucy Mercer Rutherfurd ( Lucy Page Mercer; April 26, 1891 – July 31, 1948) was an American woman who was best known for her affair with US president  Franklin D. Roosevelt.

Background
Lucy Page Mercer was born on April 26, 1891, in Washington, D.C., to Carroll Mercer (1857–1917), a member of Theodore Roosevelt's "Rough Riders" cavalry military unit in the campaigns in Cuba, on the south shore of the island near Santiago during the brief Spanish–American War in 1898, and Minna Leigh (Minnie) Tunis (1863–1947), an independent woman of "Bohemian" exotic, free-spirited tastes. Lucy had one sister, Violetta Carroll Mercer (1889–1947). Though they were both from wealthy, well-connected families, Mercer's parents lost their fortune through the Financial Panic of 1893 and subsequent great recession/depression which curtailed their lavish spending. The pair separated shortly after Lucy's birth, and Carroll became an alcoholic. Minnie then raised the girls alone.

Affair with Franklin D. Roosevelt

As a young woman, Lucy Mercer worked in a dress shop. In 1914, Mercer was hired by Eleanor Roosevelt to become her social secretary. She quickly became an established part of the Roosevelt household, and good friends with Eleanor. According to historians Joseph Persico and Hazel Rowley, the affair between Mercer and Franklin likely began in 1916, when Eleanor and the children were vacationing at Campobello Island to avoid the summer heat, while Franklin remained in Washington, D.C. In 1917, Franklin often included Mercer in his summer yachting parties, which Eleanor usually declined to attend.

In June 1917, Mercer quit or was fired from her job with Eleanor and enlisted in the US Navy, which was then mobilizing for World War I. Franklin was at that time the Assistant Secretary of the Navy, and Mercer was assigned to his office. Mercer and Franklin continued to see one another privately, causing widespread gossip in Washington. Alice Roosevelt Longworth—daughter of Theodore Roosevelt, and a cousin of Eleanor's—encouraged the affair, inviting Mercer and Franklin to dinner together several times. She later commented, "He deserved a good time. ... He was married to Eleanor."

In 1918, Franklin went on a trip to Europe to inspect naval facilities for the war. When he returned in September, sick with pneumonia in both lungs, Eleanor discovered a packet of love letters from Mercer in his suitcase. Eleanor subsequently offered her husband a divorce.

Franklin's mother, Sara Delano Roosevelt, was adamantly against the idea of divorce, however, as it would mark the end of Franklin's political career; she stated that she would cut him off from the family fortune if he chose separation. Historians have also debated whether, as a Roman Catholic, Mercer would have been willing to marry a divorced man. Eleanor Roosevelt biographer Blanche Wiesen Cook expressed skepticism that this had been a serious obstacle, noting the depth of Mercer's feelings. Persico also doubts that this was a factor, observing that Mercer's mother Minnie had divorced and remarried, and that the family had come to Roman Catholicism only recently.

In the end, Franklin appears to have told Mercer disingenuously that Eleanor was not willing to grant a divorce. He and Eleanor remained married, and he pledged never to see Mercer again. The Roosevelts' son James later described the state of the marriage after the incident as "an armed truce that endured until the day he died." Eleanor later wrote, "I have the memory of an elephant. I can forgive, but never forget." The incident marked a turning point in her life; disillusioned with her marriage, she became active in public life, and focused increasingly on her social work rather than her role as a wife.

Marriage and continued contact with Roosevelt
Mercer left Washington after the affair and became the governess for the children of Winthrop Rutherfurd (1862–1944), a wealthy New York socialite. Winthrop Rutherfurd had proposed to socialite Consuelo Vanderbilt (1877–1964) in 1896, only to see her social-climbing mother instead force her into marriage with Charles Spencer-Churchill, 9th Duke of Marlborough (1871–1934) (cousin to later British prime minister Winston Churchill). 

Now in his fifties, Rutherfurd was considered one of society's most eligible widowers. On February 11, 1920, Mercer became his second wife. Franklin Roosevelt learned of the marriage by overhearing news of it at a party. The Rutherfurds had one child, Barbara Mercer Rutherfurd (June 14, 1922–November 6, 2005), who married Robert Winthrop "Bobby" Knowles, Jr. in 1946.

Despite Roosevelt's promise to Eleanor, he kept in contact with Lucy Rutherfurd after her marriage, corresponding with her by letter throughout the 1920s. Historian/author Persico speculates that these letters may have been the cause of the 1927 nervous breakdown of Roosevelt's long-time unmarried first secretary Marguerite "Missy" LeHand (1898–1944), as LeHand was also reputedly in love with Roosevelt and no medical cause for her breakdown was found.

In 1926, Roosevelt mailed Rutherfurd a copy of his first public lecture after his 1921 paralytic illness, privately dedicating it to her with an inscription. At his first memorable presidential inauguration on March 4, 1933, Roosevelt made arrangements for Rutherfurd to attend and witness his swearing-in. When her husband later suffered a stroke, she contacted Roosevelt to arrange for him to be cared for at well-regarded Walter Reed Army Medical Center in Washington, D.C. Historian/author Doris Kearns Goodwin speculated that an entry in the White House ushers diary for August 1, 1941 included a code name for Lucy Rutherfurd, suggesting that she attended a private dinner with the president then. After her husband's death in 1944, when the two began seeing each other more occasionally, Rutherfurd also arranged for her friend Elizabeth Shoumatoff (1888–1980), a well-known artist, to paint Roosevelt's portrait.

Winthrop Rutherfurd died in March 1944 after a long illness. Rutherfurd continued to meet more frequently with Roosevelt in the months that followed. In June 1944, Roosevelt requested of his daughter Anna, who was then managing some White House social functions and acting as hostess, that she help him arrange to meet Rutherfurd without Eleanor's knowledge. Aware of Rutherfurd's role in her parents' early marriage, Anna was at first angry that her father had put her in such a difficult position. However, she ultimately relented and set up a meeting in Georgetown. 

To her surprise, Anna found that she liked Rutherfurd immediately, and the pair became friends. There were supposedly several dinners in the White House's second-floor private quarters during Roosevelt's last year which were attended by Rutherfurd in a group with Anna's presence and obvious acceptance. When Eleanor discovered, shortly after Roosevelt's death, from some female cousins, of Anna's role in arranging these meetings, the relationship between Eleanor and Anna became strained and cool for some time.

In early April 1945, Anna arranged for Rutherfurd to come over from her South Carolina estate in Aiken to meet her father at his "Little White House" in Warm Springs, Georgia, the small plain rustic cottage built at the polio therapy center by the heated mineral water springs resort that Roosevelt helped develop beginning in the 1920s. Rutherfurd and Shoumatoff, along with two female cousins, were sitting there as the artist worked on her painting of Roosevelt as he sat at a card table by the living room stone fireplace, fine-tuning a future speech and reading over some other papers on the early afternoon of April 12, 1945. In this quiet domestic scene as the two had just been smiling at each other, Roosevelt suddenly placed his hand up on his forehead and temple, saying "I have a terrific headache," then slumped over losing consciousness. Later, his two doctors - called in soon after the event - said he had suffered a fatal cerebral hemorrhage. Since a thorough medical exam a year before, he had received increasingly more intensive care and concern from a young recently recruited private physician.
 The two women, Mercer and Shoumatoff, immediately packed and left the cottage. Eleanor nonetheless soon later learned the truth from the cousins and felt doubly betrayed to learn of her daughter's role in the long-time deception. Finding Shoumatoff's unfinished preliminary watercolor among Franklin's possessions some time later however, she mailed it to Rutherfurd, to which Rutherfurd responded with a warm letter of thanks and condolences.

In 1947, Rutherfurd's sister Violetta committed suicide after her husband requested a divorce, and only a month later, on Christmas Day 1947, her mother Minnie died at age 84. Just seven months later, Rutherfurd herself died from leukemia, aged 57, on July 31, 1948, just  years after Roosevelt, having destroyed almost all of her correspondence with the president. Rutherfurd is buried, along with her husband, in Green Township, New Jersey.

Public revelation of affair
Following Roosevelt's death, his administration concealed from the press the fact that Rutherfurd had been present during his death, fearing the scandal that would ensue. Shoumatoff's presence became known, and she gave a press conference to address questions, but managed to hide Rutherfurd's role, which was even not mentioned in early post-war biographies and administration histories for almost two decades. Roosevelt's second private secretary Grace Tully (1900–1984), who had also been at Warm Springs at the time of his death, did briefly mention Rutherfurd's presence in F.D.R., My Boss, her 1949 memoir, but gave no further hint of the relationship. Though it was reported several times in Eleanor's lifetime that Roosevelt had had a serious affair with an unnamed Catholic woman, this remained only a rumor for decades.

The Mercer–Roosevelt affair became wider public knowledge in 1966 when revealed in The Time Between the Wars, a memoir by Jonathan W. Daniels (1902–1981), a Roosevelt aide from 1943 to 1945. When the news of the memoir's contents broke, Franklin Delano Roosevelt Jr. (1914–1988), said that he had no knowledge of an affair between Rutherfurd and his father, while Rutherfurd's daughter Barbara flatly denied that any such romance had occurred. Well-known historian Arthur Schlesinger Jr. (1917–2007) stated of the affair that if Rutherfurd "in any way helped Franklin Roosevelt sustain the frightful burdens of leadership in the second world war, the nation has good reason to be grateful to her."

Popular culture
Mercer's friendship with Franklin Roosevelt was portrayed in the well-regarded TV mini-series Eleanor and Franklin, with Mercer portrayed by actress Linda Kelsey in the 1976 telecast, based on the best-selling biography of the same name by Eleanor's personal friend Joseph P. Lash, published in 1971.

In addition, the relationship was covered in an episode of The President's documentaries for the PBS American Experience series on American history, as well as in the 2014 PBS miniseries The Roosevelts, directed by noted documentary film-maker Ken Burns, with an accompanying companion pictorial book by Geoffrey Perrett.

Furthermore, Eleanor's discovery of the relationship and subsequent discussion of divorce with Franklin's mother are portrayed in the fourth episode of the Showtime series "The First Lady." Rutherfurd is portrayed by Maria Dizzia.

References

Bibliography
 
 
 
 

1891 births
1948 deaths
Rutherfurd family
Burials in New Jersey
Deaths from leukemia
Franklin D. Roosevelt
Military personnel from Washington, D.C.
Mistresses of United States presidents
People_from_Warren_County,_New_Jersey
People from Aiken, South Carolina
Catholics from New Jersey
Catholics from South Carolina
Deaths from cancer in the United States